The Men's Freestyle 48 kilograms at the 1992 Summer Olympics as part of the wrestling program were held at the Institut Nacional d'Educació Física de Catalunya from August 4 to August 6. The wrestlers are divided into 2 groups. The winner of each group decided by a double-elimination system.

Results 
Legend
WO — Won by walkover

Elimination A

Round 1

Round 2

Round 3

Round 4

Round 5

Round 6

Summary

Elimination B

Round 1

Round 2

Round 3

Round 4

Round 5

Summary

Finals

Final standing

References

External links
Official Report

Freestyle 48kg